Dijon Isaiah McFarlane (born June 5, 1990), known professionally as Mustard (also known as DJ Mustard), is an American record producer. He is a frequent collaborator with California-based hip hop artists YG and Ty Dolla Sign; among various other records for hip hop and R&B artists since his entrance into mainstream music with Tyga's 2011 single "Rack City".

Mustard's production style has been described as an up-tempo, club-oriented, catchy yet rudimentary melodic hip hop style. This style has developed into the contemporary production style of West Coast hip hop during the early 2010s, which he calls "ratchet music". Almost all of his productions begin or end with the tag "Mustard on the beat, ho!", a voice sample of YG, who says it at the end of "I'm Good", one of their early collaborations, as well as claps and repetition of the word "hey".

Mustard has released three albums: 10 Summers in August 2014, Cold Summer in September 2016, and Perfect Ten in June 2019.

Early life
McFarlane was born in Los Angeles, California to Jamaican parents. In a 2013 interview with The Fader magazine, he stated that his father was deported to Jamaica when he was young, but that they do still keep in touch. When McFarlane was 11 years old, his uncle, Tyrei Lacy who was both a parental figure and a DJ, let him DJ at a family party. He acquired his DJ name from the condiment dijon mustard because his first name is also Dijon. He began DJing more as he got older, and became much more skilled at the craft which led to him DJing at the local clubs.

Career
 
In an interview with Sway's Universe, DJ Mustard described his business relationship with West coast rapper YG. Since YG's second mixtape The Real 4Fingaz, he has produced on all of his mixtapes. "I started making beats for YG; he was one [of] the first people to do my beats. I started with him, so for us to do a mixtape was easy. We created this dancing sound. I feel like we owed it to the streets and we're not stopping." DJ Mustard has produced singles by YG such as "Bitches Ain't Shit" featuring rappers Tyga and Nipsey Hussle, and "You Broke" also featuring Nipsey Hussle. During 2010, DJ Mustard released an unofficial compilation album with various artists through the label Thump Records that was called Let's Jerk named after the street dance called jerking in Los Angeles.

During late 2011, DJ Mustard produced Tyga's third single "Rack City" from his second album Careless World: Rise of the Last King. The song was released in December 2011, and peaked at number 7 on the Billboard Hot 100 chart, number 1 on the Hot R&B/Hip-Hop Songs chart, and number 2 on the Hot Rap Songs chart. It was also certified 2× platinum by the RIAA. According to Mustard, the beat for the song was originally for YG. YG told Mustard that Tyga needed a beat, so he sent the beat to Tyga. DJ Mustard's career was given a huge blast from the song. He also produced two tracks from Tyga's mixtape Well Done 3, the third installment of his Well Done series and his song "Hit Em Up" featuring rapper Jadakiss from his third album Hotel California, released on April 9, 2013.

During 2012, DJ Mustard produced Atlanta rapper 2 Chainz's song "I'm Different" that was released as the third single from his major debut album Based on a T.R.U. Story on November 8. The song charted at number 6 on the Hot R&B/Hip-Hop Songs chart and was certified gold by the RIAA, selling over 500,000 copies digitally. Also later in 2012, DJ Mustard produced the song R.I.P. by Atlanta rapper Young Jeezy that was released as the lead single from his twelfth mixtape It's Tha World on February 5, 2013. The song features 2 Chainz, making this the second time he has rapped over Mustard's beats since "I'm Different". The song charted at number 17 on the Hot R&B/Hip-Hop Songs chart. Mustard has also produced tracks on rapper Bow Wow's seventh album Underrated such as "We In Da Club" which was released as the second single from that album. However, as stated by Bow Wow in 2012, the album has been indefinitely been delayed and he is no longer focusing on it.

On June 3, 2013, DJ Mustard released his official debut mixtape Ketchup. The mixtape contained guest appearances from artists such as Lil Snupe, YG, Ty$, Joe Moses, Kid Ink, Nipsey Hussle, Casey Veggies, Ca$h Out, Clyde Carson, Dorrough, Dom Kennedy, and Lil Jon. Later in June, Mustard produced Atlanta rapper B.o.B's song HeadBand featuring 2 Chainz, which was released as the second single from his third studio album Underground Luxury. The song has charted at number 21 on the Hot R&B/Hip-Hop Songs chart. On September 17, DJ Mustard produced West coast rapper Kid Ink's song "Show Me" featuring Chris Brown, released as the first single from his upcoming second studio album My Own Lane. The single peaked at number 1 on the U.S. Rhythmic Billboard Chart. On September 17, 2013, DJ Mustard produced YG's mega-anthem "My Nigga" for his debut studio album "My Krazy Life", which peaked at number 5 on the U.S. Rhythmic Billboard chart. 
On November 18, 2013, DJ Mustard announced that he had signed to Jay-Z's Roc Nation as an artist, and revealed plans to release his own studio album. On December 18, 2013, he was named the runner-up for producer of the year by HipHopDX.
On March 11, 2014, DJ Mustard produced Kid Ink's "Main Chick" also featuring Chris Brown for his second studio album My Own Lane. It peaked at number 3 on the U.S. Rhythmic Billboard chart.

In 2016, worked with Trea Fittz on his debut album, released October 11. He released "Don't Hurt Me" with Jeremih and Nicki Minaj on his album Cold Summer. The album included long-time collaborators YG and Ty Dolla Sign. The album also included Rick Ross, Young Jeezy, K Camp, and more. It was released on September 30, 2016.

On June 28, 2019, Mustard's third album, Perfect Ten was released, and spawned the Grammy-nominated single, "Ballin'".

Production style

Mustard's production style has been described as an up-tempo, radio-friendly, club-oriented, catchy hip hop style which he calls "ratchet music". Mustard's body of work has been recognized by critics as sonically cohesive and recognizable in that many of his tracks have recurring, identifiable motifs. Most apparent is his producer signature "Mustard on that beat, ho!" which prefaces the beat drop in many of his songs. This signature is often strategically placed to span the third and fourth counts of the measure preceding the song's drop to make it more catchy. On a compositional level, however, Mustard's motifs also include: an ambient chant of "Hey!" on the off-beats in the background of his music; the emphasized, minimalist bass synth opening to many songs (most notably on My Nigga, R.I.P., and Rack City), 808 kicks and the use of crisp hand-claps and snap-snares.

Mustard uses the music production software Reason, first using 5, 6 and currently using 6.5. In an interview with The Fader magazine he stated, "With this ratchet music, I'm trying to create my own sound. I want to make this to where it can't leave, this is something that everybody's gonna get used to. Like how everybody got used to Lil Jon or Luke. I don't want it to be something that comes and goes, I want it to be something that's here forever like a real culture."

As a result of the recognizably and commonality between many of Mustard's chart-topping singles, a number of artists who employ production similar to DJ Mustard's have been criticized for lack of originality and plagiarism. In a July 2014 interview with Tim Westwood, the rapper YG, whose album My Krazy Life was mostly produced by Mustard, stated that Iggy Azalea's song "Fancy" "jocked" Mustard's style. Like many of Mustard's songs, the song includes a minimalist G-funk style synth and samples a layered "Hey" voice chant. He has been compared to rap producers like Dr Dre and many old rappers from the golden age of hip hop.

Personal life
Mustard started dating model Chanel Thierry when he was 19; the couple got engaged in 2018 and married on October 10, 2020. They have three children.

On May 3, 2022, Mustard announced that he had filed for divorce from Chanel Thierry.

On June 5, 2020, his 30th birthday, Mustard revealed on Instagram his 47-pound weight loss.

Discography

Studio albums

Mixtapes

Singles

Other charted songs

Production discography

Notes

References

External links

 
 
 
 

1990 births
Living people
21st-century African-American musicians
21st-century American male musicians
African-American record producers
American hip hop DJs
American hip hop record producers
American music industry executives
American people of Jamaican descent
Businesspeople from Los Angeles
Interscope Records artists
Musicians from Los Angeles
Record producers from California
Republic Records artists
Roc Nation artists
Trap musicians